Gil Eanes (or Eannes, in the old Portuguese spelling) was a 15th-century Portuguese navigator and explorer.

Biography
Gil Eanes was born in Lagos<ref>[https://translate.google.com/translate?hl=en&sl=pt&u=http://ensina.rtp.pt/artigo/gil-eanes-dobra-o-cabo-bojador/&prev=search "Gil Eanes doubles the Bojador", Ensina RTP]</ref> in 1395. Little is known about his personal life prior to his role in the Portuguese Age of Discovery, and was considered a household servant and shield-bearer of the Infante Henry the Navigator. He was a native of Lagos on which he based his sea voyages, in the southern Algarve. 

He joined the service of Prince Henry's expeditions in 1433, when the Infante entrusted him with a vessel and crew, in order to attempt to round Cape Bojador, a cape impassable with their level of knowledge and equipment.Alan Viliers (1956), p.28 Sailing from Lagos, Portugal, Eanes made an unknown number of voyages along the west coast of Africa, before being driven west towards the Canary Islands. In the islands he captured some natives and returned with them as captives to Sagres, excusing his failure by recounting the dangers of the trip. His return was greeted with reserve and coldness in the court of Prince Henry, who had expected the navigator to succeed in rounding the Cape. Eanes hoped to return to favour in the following year, if the Prince would favour him with a second expedition. In 1434, his barquentine-caravel and crew was able to sail beyond Cape Bojador and return to Sagres via a volta do mar, reporting the conditions of the water, land and ease of navigation beyond the Cape, and bringing with him some wild roses to prove that they had succeeded in their expedition. The discovery of a passable route around Cape Bojador marked the beginning of the Portuguese exploration of Africa. 

Eanes made another voyage, with Afonso Gonçalves Baldaia, in 1435. They sailed about 30 leagues (144 km), or even 50 leagues (240 km) south of Cape Bojador and reached the African coast. Although they did not discover any inhabitants immediately, they did find traces of a human presence, during a voyage that was considered favourable. They named the bay in which they anchored Angra dos Ruivos (Cove of Reds''), for the abundance of fish (resembling gurnets) that they caught in the waters.

Namesakes
A city square is named in his native city of Lagos, Portugal.

An old lyceum in Mindelo on the island of São Vicente, Cape Verde, was named for him. In the 1930s, it had the best education on the island and the archipelago.  Today it is known as Escola Jorge Barbosa, and forms a campus of the University of Cape Verde.

A Portuguese Navy ship built in 1955 was named after him.

See also
List of explorations
List of explorers
Portuguese Empire
Timeline of European exploration

Notes

Sources

 
 
 
 
 

15th-century explorers of Africa
Portuguese explorers
Maritime history of Portugal
15th-century Portuguese people
15th-century deaths
Year of birth unknown
People from Lagos, Portugal